Hutan Ashrafian is an academic, surgeon, entrepreneur, historian, writer, martial artist and philosopher. He is the current chief scientific officer of Preemptive Health and Medicine at Flagship Pioneering.

Ashrafian thoracotomy, surgical procedure, and the Ashrafian sign aortic regurgitation are named after him. He introduced the AIonAI law for artificial intelligence.

Early life and education
Ashrafian attended the Westminster School and then University College London, where he completed Bachelor of Science in immunology and cell pathology and subsequently a medical degree (MD) in 2000. Following London-based surgical training in pediatric cardiothoracic surgery, robotic surgery , general surgery with specialist training in bariatric surgery, in 2015, he finished his Wellcome Trust PhD in computational biology and surgery from Imperial College London and was appointed National Institute for Health and Care Research clinical lecturer. 

Ashrafian also holds a Master of Business Administration from Warwick Business School, graduated in 2017.

Career
Ashrafian was appointed as Chief Scientific Adviser at the Institute of Global Health Innovation, Imperial College London in 2017. 

In 2017, he co-founded Oxford Medical Products along with Jan Czenurska to treat overweight and obesity with a novel hydrogel.

In September 2020, during the COVID-19 pandemic, he became the chief medical officer of British American Tobacco where he developed a plant-based COVID-19 vaccine with its subsidiary KBP, and served there until August 2021.

In August 2021, he was appointed as the chief scientific officer of Flagship Pioneering.

Ashrafian is Professor of Research Impact at Leeds University Business School and also Senior Research Fellow at Imperial College London. He has worked on documentaries for BBC and Smithsonian Channel.

Research
Ashrafian's research is focused on a wide programme ranging from life sciences, philosophy of science and artificial intelligence, ancient history and art. In the life sciences these focus on mechanistic and clinical therapeutic solutions in obesity, cancer, metabolic syndrome, gut microbiome dysfunction, and musculoskeletal dysfunction. In a research published in 2014, he concluded that social networking programs can help reduce the obesity.

Philosophical contributions include those in areas of physiology, the Simulation Argument, temporal paradoxes in theoretical physics and artificial intelligence interactions (AIonAI law) and psychiatry, AI and politics and the Turing Test. In artificial intelligence field, Ashrafian is one of the authors of STARD-AI protocol, a reporting guideline for artificial intelligence, and QUADAS-AI, a quality assessment tool for artificial intelligence. He is considered one of the leading researchers in artificial intelligence.

In ancient history his work includes books on contextualizing historical events and figures such as Alexander the Great and Xenophon with accurate timelines and scientific explanations of occurrences. This extends in separating myth from legend in classical Greek and Homeric poetry and explaining the medical diseases prominent historical characters such as the Pharaohs Tutankhamun, Akhenaten, Julius Caesar and Henry VIII's multiple marriages and behaviour which have subsequently featured in documentaries where Ashrafian is interviewed. 

His 2012 work on the Eighteenth Dynasty of Egypt, theorized that the Pharaoh Tutankhamun had temporal epilepsy that led to his early demise. The book he co-authored with his student Francesco Maria Galassi, named Julius Caesar's Disease: A New Diagnosis. was reviewed by Spyros Retsas of the British Society for the History of Medicine and Neurological Sciences.

In art, he has worked on identifying diseases, and previously unrecognized anatomical and pathological features in over 60 famous artworks that includes those in the renaissance, and ancient art. This includes the work of Leonardo da Vinci, where he identified a hernia in the famous image of the Vitruvian man.

Awards and recognition
 RCS Arris and Gale award
 Hunterian Prize
 Wellcome Trust Research Fellowship

Bibliography

Books
 Ashrafian, Hutan (2014). Warrior Origins: The Historical and Legendary Links Between Bodhidharma, Shaolin Kung-Fu, Karate and Ninjutsu
 Ashrafian, Hutan (2015). Surgical Philosophy: Concepts of Modern Surgery Paralleled to Sun Tzu's 'Art of War'''
 Galassi, Francesco Maria; Ashrafian, Hutan (2016). Julius Caesar's Disease: A New Diagnosis Ashrafian, Hutan (2016). The Diary of Hannibal Barca: A Chronological Retrospect Centered on Polybius' Histories III
 Ashrafian, Hutan; Ahmed, Kamran; Khan, Muhammad Shamim; Athanasiou, Thanos (2016). The Pocket Guide to Neoplasm
 Ashrafian, Hutan (2017). The Diary of Alexander the Great: A Chronological Retrospect Centred On Arrian's Anabasis Alexandri
 Ashrafian, Hutan (2017). The Diary of Xenophon's Anabasis: A Chronological Retrospect
 Ashrafian, Hutan (2017). Advances in Artificial Intelligence and Application
 Ashrafian, Hutan (2018). Surgical Eponyms: For General Surgery FRCS, MRCS, European and American Board Exams
 Ashrafian, Hutan (2018). The Diary of Homer's Odyssey: A Chronological Retrospect
 Ashrafian, Hutan (2019). The Diary of Homer's Iliad: A Chronological Retrospect
 Ashrafian, Hutan (2019). The Diary of Jason and the Argonauts: A Chronological Retrospect of Apollonius Rhodius' Argonuatica
 Ashrafian, Hutan, Niklas Lidströmer (2022). Artificial Intelligence in Medicine

Selected publications
 Ashrafian, Hutan et al. (2020). International evaluation of an AI system for breast cancer screening
 Ashrafian, Hutan et al. (2011). Understanding the role of gut microbiome–host metabolic signal disruption in health and disease
 Ashrafian, Hutan et al. (2011). Metabolic surgery profoundly influences gut microbial–host metabolic cross-talk
 Ashrafian, Hutan et al. (2010). Emotional intelligence in medicine: a systematic review through the context of the ACGME competencies
 Ashrafian, Hutan et al. (2012). Technologies for global health

References

British historians
21st-century British writers
Alumni of Imperial College London